Middleton Stuart Elliott Jr. (October 16, 1872 – October 29, 1952) was a United States Navy admiral and a Medal of Honor recipient for his role in the United States occupation of Veracruz.

Biography 

Elliott was born on October 16, 1872, in Beaufort, South Carolina. His father was Middleton Stuart Elliott Sr. (1841–1921), who served in the Beaufort Volunteer Artillery in the Confederate States Army during the American Civil War. His uncle was Brigadier General Stephen Elliott. He was raised in Beaufort and attended medical school at Columbia College, known later as George Washington University.

Elliott was appointed from South Carolina to the United States Navy as a Passed Assistant Surgeon, with the rank of ensign. In October 1899, Elliott was promoted to lieutenant (junior grade) and ordered to Port Royal Naval Station, South Carolina. While at sea, he was promoted to lieutenant. In March 1903, Elliott was promoted to Surgeon with the corresponding rank of lieutenant commander. In November, he reported to Naval Hospital Norfolk, Virginia. In November 1908, he was assigned to the Naval Hospital in Washington D.C.

While on Florida, he participated as a Surgeon in the intervention at Vera Cruz, Mexico. On April 21, 1914, he quickly established a base hospital and supervised the removal of the wounded and field station operations until the city's capture the next day. For his "distinguished conduct in battle" on this occasion, he was awarded the Medal of Honor. That summer, he reported for shore duty at the Navy Recruiting Station in New York City. While on recruiting duty in August 1916, he was promoted to Medical Inspector with the corresponding rank of commander. During World War I, he commanded the Naval Hospital and Supply Depot at Cañacao Bay, Philippines. In January 1918, Elliott was promoted Medical Director with the corresponding rank of captain. Returning to Washington D.C. in December 1919, he assumed command of the Naval Hospital.

In April 1923, Elliott served at the Mare Island Navy Yard, Vallejo, California, followed by a tour at the Puget Sound Navy Yard, Bremerton, Washington. In June 1927, he was promoted to rear admiral, which made him the first medical officer in the United States Navy to reach the rank of admiral. In June 1929, he became the District Medical Officer for the Eleventh Naval District based in San Diego, California. Returning to Washington, D.C. three years later, he served on the Naval Retirement Board observing Medical and Naval Exams. Remaining in the area during the last quarter of 1933, he became an inspector at the Medical Department Activities section within the Bureau of Medicine and Surgery. In January 1935, Elliott became the president of the Naval Retirement Board. In December, he was appointed as the Inspector of Medical Department Activities for the Eleventh, Twelve, Thirteenth, and Fourteenth Naval Districts. In November 1936, he retired and was placed on the retired list. During World War II, he was briefly recalled to active duty in February 1942, was promoted to vice admiral, and then was placed back on the retired list with his promoted rank. Elliott died on October 29, 1952, and is buried at Fort Rosecrans National Cemetery, San Diego, California.

In 2004, the elementary school at the Marine Corps Base Beaufort, South Carolina, was named in his honor.

Medal of Honor citation
Elliott's official Medal of Honor citation reads:
For distinguished conduct in battle, engagements of Vera Cruz, 21 and 22 April 1914. Surg. Elliott was eminent and conspicuous in the efficient establishment and operation of the base hospital, and in his cool judgment and courage in supervising first aid stations on the firing line and removing the wounded.

See also

 List of Medal of Honor recipients (Veracruz)

References

External links 
 
 

1872 births
1952 deaths
People from Beaufort, South Carolina
United States Navy vice admirals
United States Navy Medal of Honor recipients
United States Navy personnel of World War I
United States Navy World War II admirals
Burials at Fort Rosecrans National Cemetery
Battle of Veracruz (1914) recipients of the Medal of Honor